Fleet of Worlds is a science fiction novel by American writers Larry Niven and Edward M. Lerner, part of Niven's Known Space series.
The Fleet of Worlds (sub)series, consisting of this book and its four sequels, is named for its opening book.

Novel
The novel, co-written by Niven and Edward M. Lerner, was released in 2007 and nominated for a Prometheus Award. It is set shortly after the events of the short story "At the Core". The novel concerns the liberation of New Terra from the Concordance of the Pierson's Puppeteers. It also introduces a new intelligent species to Known Space, the Gw'oth.

Series
The Fleet of World series consists of five books by the same authors:

Fleet of Worlds (2007),
 Juggler of Worlds (2008),
 Destroyer of Worlds (2009),
 Betrayer of Worlds (2010), and
 Fate of Worlds: Return from the Ringworld (2012).

The first four novels are prequels to Ringworld; the last one is a sequel.

References

External links 
 The Incompleat Known Space Concordance

Novels by Larry Niven
Known Space stories
2007 American novels
2007 science fiction novels
American science fiction novels
Tor Books books